Edward Brooke Lee (October 23, 1892 – September 21, 1984) was a Maryland politician and a veteran of World War I.

Early years 
Edward Brooke Lee was born on October 23, 1892, at the Blair-Lee House in Washington, D.C. His parents were Francis Preston Blair Lee and Anne Clymer (Brooke) Lee. Blair Lee represented Maryland in the U.S. Senate. E. Brooke Lee's great-grandfather, Richard Henry Lee, signed the Declaration of Independence and represented Virginia in the U.S. senate. E. Brooke Lee's great-uncle was Montgomery Blair, who served as postmaster general during Abraham Lincoln's presidency.

E. Brooke Lee attended the Pomfret School in Connecticut, and he graduated in 1912. Lee went on to attend Princeton University, but he left in good standing during his sophomore year in 1916 in order to act as his father's legislative assistant in the Senate. Lee then graduated from George Washington University Law School in 1917.

On April 13, 1914, Lee married Elizabeth Somerville Wilson, the daughter of Maryland Senator Joseph S. Wilson. They had two sons- the elder being Blair Lee III- and a daughter, Elizabeth Lee Scull, herself involved in politics and as an activist in community affairs, who predeceased her father in 1981. With his second wife, Thelma Lawson, he had a son, Bruce.

Military career 

Lee joined Maryland National Guard F Company, 1st Maryland Infantry of Hyattsville in 1912. Lee and Frank L. Hewitt, another businessman and real estate investor, helped build an armory and organize a new Maryland Guard company, Company K, located in Silver Spring in 1914. (The armory was later remodeled and now houses the Silver Spring Volunteer Fire Department.)

Lee advanced through the ranks to first lieutenant. Company K was activated into federal service on June 28, 1916, to Eagle Pass, Texas. Lee commanded Company K and helped General John J. Pershing pursue Mexican revolutionary and bandit Pancho Villa, who had been running border patrols along the Rio Grande River into New Mexico. Company K continued its federal service until June 28, 1916.

Lee was promoted to Captain, Infantry, National Guard of Maryland on January 29, 1917. Soon thereafter, the United States entered World War I, and Company K was again mustered into federal service in June 1917. Lee and Company K encamped at Blair Lee's field west of Georgia Avenue and north of Kalmia Road in the District of Columbia. The National Guard unit of 150 men was sent to Camp McClellan, near Anniston, Alabama in August 1917 for a period of ten months of training, emerging as Company K of the 115th Infantry, 29th Division of the American Expeditionary Force.

From 1917 to 1918, Lee served in France during World War I as part of the 115th Infantry Regiment, 29th Division, American Expeditionary Forces.

While commanding of a raiding party against the Central Powers Balschwiller, France, on the morning of August 31, 1918, Lee led soldiers' advance through the enemy wire. Lee was the last person to leave the opposing forces' trenches, and he carried wounded soldiers back through the counter-barrage. Lee spent the entire day of August 31 in a shell hole in no man's land because he wanted to help all wounded soldiers return to the American line. For this, Lee was awarded the Distinguished Service Cross and the Silver Star Citation.

Lee received a promotion to the rank of major. He twice received the French Croix de Guerre. Lee also received the Belgian Order of Leopold.

In June 1918, Lee was discharged from active duty with the rank of lieutenant colonel, and he was generally considered a war hero.

After the war, Lee became chief of staff of the 29th Infantry of the Maryland National Guard.

Political career 
In 1919, a group of influential Maryland Democrats approached Lee to encourage him to run for political office in Maryland. Lee was reluctant to jump into state politics so soon after World War I. The group wanted Lee to run for Maryland Comptroller. Lee repeatedly turned them down. The Democratic candidate for Maryland governor, Albert Ritchie, begged Lee to run.

Recalling this time in a 1977 interview, Lee said, "I had an interesting experience when the transport got into Norfolk harbor or Newport News harbor. They threw The Baltimore Sun on board, and The Baltimore Sun edition that they threw on board said, 'Senator Smith Favors Young Lee for Comptroller."

Lee campaigned on the ticket of Governor Albert Ritchie as the 25th Comptroller of the State of Maryland. In 1921, Lee co-founded United Democratic Clubs of Montgomery County, and he served as its treasurer. In 1923, Lee was the Secretary of State of Maryland, and he served in that position for two years. He represented Montgomery County in the Maryland House of Delegates between 1927 and 1930, during which time he also served as the Speaker of the House of Delegates. In 1933, Governor Ritchie appointed Lee to the Committee on Public Works. Lee served as the State Roads Commissioner in 1934.

Development of Montgomery County and Prince George's County 
Lee set up the first land-use and zoning system for Montgomery County, Maryland. Lee strongly advocated for using zoning laws to plan suburban growth in the county.  In 1916, Lee helped establish the Washington Suburban Sanitary Commission to control the development of regional water and sewer systems that were necessary for the county's growth. In the early 1920s, Lee began to purchase large tracts of farming land and founded the North Washington Realty Company to develop those properties as racially restricted suburban communities. These restrictive covenants forbid the purchase or reselling of these properties by people of "African descent" and remained in effect until 1948 when the Supreme Court in Shelley v. Kraemer ruled they were unenforceable. Lee continued to defend racially restrictive covenants well into the 1960s, claiming that "since law-enforced opening of homes and home communities is only aimed at White owned homes and White occupied communities, the law-enforced open housing statutes are Anti-White laws" in a letter to the Bethesda-Chevy Chase Advertiser in March, 1967.

In December 1926, Lee proposed a tax on certain parts of Montgomery and Prince George's counties in order to pay for street construction, lighting, garbage collection, and ash collection.

In January 1927, Lee proposed the creation of the Maryland-National Capital Park and Planning Commission, led by three commissioners appointed by the governor. The Commission would be funded by taxes on residents in Montgomery and Prince George's counties.

Farming and cattle-raising 

Lee spent the last 30 years of his life at the Old Gartrell Farm, located on Sweepstakes Road in Damascus. Lee farmed and raised Polled Hereford cattle in Maryland, Missouri, and Mississippi. He became the largest breeder of Polled Hereford cattle in the United States. and was the first member of the Polled Hereford Hall of Fame in Kansas City in 1960. for

Maryland Hereford Association named an award after Lee and his third wife Nina G. Jones. The Nina and E. Brooke Lee Award is awarded in recognition of education, leadership, and support of the Maryland Hereford Association and Maryland's Hereford industry.

Lee died of pneumonia in Damascus on September 21, 1984, at the age of 91. He is buried at Rock Creek Cemetery in Washington, D.C.

Legacy
Col. E. Brooke Lee Middle School opened in Kemp Mill, Maryland, in 1966.

In early 2019, Montgomery County Council President Nancy Navarro wrote to the county school system to request that it change the school's name because of Col. Lee's lifelong support of racial segregationism. The school's name was changed to Odessa Shannon Middle School on July 4, 2021. Shannon was elected to the Montgomery County Board of Education in 1982, which made her the first Black woman elected to public office in the county. Shannon was also the executive director of the Montgomery County Human Rights Commission, and she founded the county’s Human Rights Hall of Fame.

References

External links 

 Lee Family papers at the University of Maryland libraries

1892 births
1984 deaths
Democratic Party members of the Maryland House of Delegates
Burials at Rock Creek Cemetery
Edward
George Washington University Law School alumni
American military personnel of World War I
Recipients of the Croix de Guerre 1914–1918 (France)
Pomfret School alumni
Blair family